The Academy of Live and Recorded Arts (ALRA) was a British drama school. It had two sites: ALRA South on Wandsworth Common in south London and ALRA North in Wigan, Greater Manchester. It was founded in 1979 by director and actor Sorrel Carson who then directed the school as its principal until 2001. The last principal was Dr. Ellie Johnson Searle (interim).

ALRA was a member of Drama UK, formerly the Conference of Drama Schools, and National Council for Drama Training, both organizations since dissolved, and received funding from the Young People's Learning Agency. It was a member of the Federation of Drama Schools.

Origins and locations

ALRA South was in the Royal Victoria Patriotic Building, a Victorian Gothic Grade 2 listed building on the edge of Wandsworth Common. The first school was opened in a Church Hall in East Finchley in 1979.

ALRA North opened in September 2010 at a former church in Wigan, Greater Manchester, moving in 2012 to Trencherfield Mill, a restored industrial building in the Wigan Pier development area, Greater Manchester. The curriculum and teaching methods were the same as at ALRA South.

Courses
ALRA offered the following courses:
Three-year Acting course – leading to BA (Hons) Acting/National Diploma in Professional Acting
Fifteen-month Acting course – leading to MA Professional Acting/National Certificate in Professional Acting
MA in Directing
Foundation Acting
Various short courses.

Acceptance
Admission to the school was based on three rounds of auditions and finally an interview with the school's directors, its registrar and an audition panel. The audition was held over the course of a single day.

Notable alumni

Jimmy Akingbola
Samuel Anderson (actor)
Clive Ashborn
Bennett Arron
Anna Brecon
Lorraine Bruce
Dominic Burgess
Rhiannon Clements
Stephanie Chambers
Ian Champion
Bridget Christie 
Thomas Craig
Amanda Eliasch
Tanya Franks
Francesca Gonshaw
Denise Gough
Miranda Hart

Daniel Healy (actor)
Joanna Jeffrees
Elizabeth Keates
Lucy Liemann
Robert Lonsdale
Kim Lukas
Paul McEwan
Steve McNeil
Sarah Parish
Mark Pegg
Pooky Quesnel
Lisa Ray
Vincent Regan
Suzi Ruffell
Georgia Steel
Amita Suman
Hannah Waddingham

Closure
It was announced that ALRA was to close with effect from 4 April 2022. Students were offered the chance to complete their studies at Rose Bruford College.  The Federation of Drama Schools, in conjunction with the UK's Office for Students, offered support to staff and students affected by the announcement, including maintaining the arrangement with St Mary's University, Twickenham for validating degrees.

References

External links

ALRA website
Royal Victoria Patriotic Building website
Dance and Drama Award Scheme website

 

Performing arts education in London
Drama schools in London
Education in the London Borough of Wandsworth
Arts organisations based in the United Kingdom
Further education colleges in Greater Manchester
Educational institutions established in 1979
1979 establishments in England
2022 disestablishments in England
Defunct drama schools
Defunct educational institutions in the United Kingdom